Alain Chabat (born 24 November 1958) is a French actor, comedian, director, screenwriter, producer and television presenter. He was originally known for his work in the comedy group Les Nuls, including as the co-writer and lead actor of La Cité de la peur (1994). He has since then become a notable filmmaker of his own, typically both writing and starring in the movies he directed, which include cult comedy films such as Asterix & Obelix: Mission Cleopatra, RRRrrrr!!!, Houba! On the Trail of the Marsupilami and Santa & Cie.

He also appeared in French Twist, The Taste of Others, The Science of Sleep, Happily Ever After and the television series Kaamelott. Additionally, he voiced the title character in the French dubbing of the Shrek franchise.

Life and career
Chabat was born in Oran, French Algeria. He is Jewish.

His media career began in 1987 when he founded the comedy group "Les Nuls" (The Lame-os) with Bruno Carette, Chantal Lauby and Dominique Farrugia. Les Nuls' first appearance on French television, on the subscriber channel Canal Plus, was a sci-fi spoof entitled Objectif Nul (a word play with Objectif Lune, the French title of the comic album Destination Moon, one of The Adventures of Tintin). The show shares striking similarities with the British TV series Red Dwarf, although both shows were released at roughly the same time and it is unlikely one influenced the other.

Both as a member of Les Nuls (in La Cité de la Peur) and in his solo efforts (including Asterix & Obelix: Mission Cleopatra, in which he both directed and acted), Chabat is one of the few French comedians who has managed to successfully emulate the heavily referential, pop-culture-based writing style of the Zucker, Abrahams and Zucker trio and adapt it to the tastes of the French audience.

Chabat also voiced the title character in the French dubs of all four Shrek films, replacing Mike Myers. He won the César Award for Best Debut in 1998 for Didier.

He co-starred in Happily Ever After (2004) and in Prête-moi ta main (2006) (which he also wrote) alongside Charlotte Gainsbourg. He played Napoleon Bonaparte in the 2009 film Night at the Museum: Battle of the Smithsonian.

Starting from 21 November 2022, Chabat will host Le Late avec Chabat on TF1 which will run for 10 episodes during the 2022 FIFA World Cup.

Filmography

Film

Television

References

External links

 
  Interview of Alain Chabat. Artistik Rezo. 2010-06-15.

1958 births
Living people
Jewish French male actors
French male film actors
French male voice actors
French humorists
French people of Algerian-Jewish descent
Pieds-Noirs
People from Oran
French film directors
French film producers
French male screenwriters
French screenwriters
20th-century French male actors
21st-century French male actors
French male television actors